Jordanhill School educates children from age 4–19. It was formerly run by Jordanhill College of Education as its demonstration school, and was previously known as Jordanhill College School.

Uniquely among Scottish schools, it is funded directly by the Scottish Government (rather than through the local authority, in this case Glasgow City Council).

The school consists of a primary department and a secondary department. In the primary, P1 & P2 have three classes of twenty-two pupils each while P3-P7 have two classes of thirty-three. Pupils in upper Primary spend up to 60% of their week working in the Secondary department. The secondary school takes in an additional thirty-three pupils in S1 to bring the number per year up to 99. The school is categorised as non-denominational.

The school is state-funded by direct grant from the Scottish Government, and is non fee-paying. The school catchment area encompasses predominantly owner-occupied housing in West Glasgow. The school regularly records among the best exam results in Scotland.

History

The college was an out-of-town location that sought to merge two teacher training centres that were heavily influenced by education training pioneer David Stow, a Glasgow merchant. These were the Free Church Normal Seminary and the Dundas Vale Normal Seminary, two of the earliest teacher training colleges in Scotland. This merger was a government-sponsored initiative of 1905, when it was decided that teacher training should be taken away from the church and placed under the control of a provincial committee.

The site of the college – and now the school – was on the old Jordanhill Estate grounds. The old Jordanhill House was demolished around 1915, with the Glasgow Provincial Committee buying the land to build their new college, though the plot had been for sale since 1911. The school buildings were completed in 1921, although the school was founded a year earlier, in 1920. Headmasters include Andrew Walker (1891–1974), who led Jordanhill College School from 1936 to 1956, having earlier served from 1921 to 1932 as a mathematics and science master and - initially - the only teacher in the new secondary department, formed in 1921 with twenty pupils. His successor, William T Branston (1915–1984), at the time of his 1956 appointment was the youngest headteacher in Scotland and whose tenure - Branston retired in December 1980 - saw successive challenges, from sustained upheaval in Scottish school curricula to a serious bid to shut Jordanhill College School in 1969. (It survived, the controversy concluding in December 1970, with the school adjusting readily to non-selective and non fee-paying status)

A former naval officer and veteran of the Second World War, committed to good works from amateur dramatics through the YMCA (he chaired the Glasgow organisation) to the Scottish National Orchestra Chorus and influential lay service in the Church of Scotland, William Branston was to most pupils an 'astonishingly remote, God-like figure'. He enforced regular religious observance – such as morning assembly – and the school was noted through the 1970s for its rigid uniform code and highly conservative, rote-learning traditional teaching methods, notably in arithmetic and English grammar.

The school remained under control of the College until 1988, when it switched to its current directly funded status. This move caused controversy at the time, with various other options considered (including becoming a Council-run establishment or, indeed, a fee-paying school). In the end a combination of a spirited "Save Our School" campaign spearheaded by Branston's successor, Alistair Cram and ingenious political machinations led to the school becoming directly funded by the Scottish Office (and later the Scottish Executive). Cram resigned in 1988, and in 1989 'College' was dropped from the school name, at the insistence of Jordanhill College.

In 1993 the college merged with the University of Strathclyde, with the Jordanhill Campus serving as home to the Education Faculty. The campus has fallen into disrepair, and is being redeveloped as new housing by CALA Homes Ltd.

Headmasters/Rectors
E.J.V Brown (1920–1923)
Tod Ritchie (1923–1931)
William Montgomerie (1931–1936)
Andrew Walker (1936–1956)
William Branston (1956–1980)
Alistair Cram (1981–1988)
William Bedborough (1989–1997)
Paul W. Thomson (1997–2020)
John D. Anderson (2020–present)

Modernisation

An addition in recent decades was the Macmillan Building, a small building behind the school; housing a classroom used for RE and additional sports changing facilities. In early 2005 the school acquired the former Laurel Park games hall on Anniesland Road, in partnership with the Glasgow Academy. Work on the multi-million modern two-storey "South Campus" was completed in mid 2009. It accommodates mainly secondary school classes and some upper primary classes. The building covers four departments: art, mathematics, modern languages, and social sciences. It is connected to the original "North Campus" via a walkway parallel to the sports pitch. The sports pitch was upgraded from blaze to artificial grass and a MUGA pitch (Multi-Use Games Area) around the same time; which has now been converted to artificial grass.

Miscellaneous

The school's Latin motto, beneath its coat of arms is "Ad summa nitor", which translates to "Strive for the highest".

The school uniform consists of dark trousers for boys (brown shorts were obligatory in the Primary Department until 1977, when the option of 'longs' was ceded to Primary Seven boys) a brown skirt (or pinafore for primary girls) for girls, a white shirt (the option of cream was permitted into the early 1990s) and a brown blazer. Girls for a long time were not allowed to wear trousers (despite movements and petitions by student bodies to end girls not being allowed to wear trousers, which had all been controversially blocked by the board of managers and the SMT for several years). Female pupils are allowed to choose to wear trousers or skirts as of 2018. 

Blazers are compulsory for all pupils. The tie is yellow, brown and green for everyone except the seniors (S5-S6), who wear a brown tie with the school crest. S4-S6 pupils achieving excellence in extra-curricular activities (for example representing their country at their chosen sport) are awarded a green Honours tie. Similarly, pupils in S5 and S6 may be awarded Colours and/or dates on their blazer. Half-Colours is a gold trim that extends around the cuff and bottom of the blazer, compared to full-Colours which also lines the collar. Colours and dates are awarded for excellence and/or achievement in music or sport. In academia, pupils who receive 5 As at Higher in S5 are awarded full Colours in S6.

The school is categorised as non-denominational, however students are required to attend 3 Christian Church services at the end of each term at Jordanhill Parish Church.

In 2015, the school controversially denied a place to a child with complex additional support needs. The school claimed, due to its unique method of funding, it did not have suitable equipment for the child.

Jordanhill's Senior Management Team (SMT) consists of:
 Rector John Anderson;
 Depute Rector Douglas Brown;
 Depute Head Teacher (responsible for Junior (S1-S3) Secondary) Andrew Fraser;
 Depute Head Teacher (responsible for Senior (S4-S6) Secondary) Susan McDade;
 Head of Primary Richard Buchan;
 Depute Head of Primary Robin G. Paton.

The railway station closest to the school is Jordanhill railway station.

The school was used as a filming location for Trainspotting, the film of the 1993 Irvine Welsh novel. The school has also been used for the filming of BBC dramas; Shetland in 2012 and 2016 and Single Father in 2010.

Notable pupils
 Gavin Arneil – paediatric nephrologist
 Tom Buchan (1931–1995) Scottish poet, novelist and playwright/dramatist.
 Corrie Dick – renowned musician
 Iain Macintyre (endocrinologist)
 Gareth Hoare - famed electrical engineer, youngest vice-president of Institution of Engineering and Technology
 Eric Forth – Conservative MP and MEP.
Jen Beattie – International footballer
Johnnie Beattie – International rugby union player
Justin Currie – main songwriter of the band Del Amitri.
Aaron Hickey - International footballer for Brentford and the Scottish National Team.

References

External links
 
 profile on ParentZone section of Education Scotland website

Educational institutions established in 1920
School
Secondary schools in Glasgow
1920 establishments in Scotland